Cyrestis camillus, the African map butterfly, is a butterfly of the family Nymphalidae. It is found in Africa, from Sierra Leone to Ethiopia and Tanzania and from Kenya to Natal.

The wingspan is 42–55 mm.

The larvae feed on Morus, Ficus and Zizyphus species.

Subspecies 
Cyrestis camillus camillus (Sierra Leone to Cameroon, Zaire, Angola, western Kenya, Ethiopia)
Cyrestis camillus elegans Boisduval, 1833 (Madagascar)
Cyrestis camillus sublineata Lathy, 1901 (Zimbabwe, Mozambique to Malawi, Zambia, Tanzania, eastern Kenya, South Africa)

External links
Recent observations
"Cyrestis Boisduval, 1832" at Markku Savela's Lepidoptera and Some Other Life Forms

Cyrestinae
Butterflies described in 1781